Alexander Varney (born 27 December 1984) is an English footballer who played in the Football League for Barnet. He currently plays for Orpington in the Kent County League.

Varney, the son of former Charlton Athletic chief executive Peter Varney, was born in Farnborough, in the London Borough of Bromley. He began his football career as a scholar with Charlton, and earned a professional contract in 2003, which was extended in 2004. A forward, he spent a month on loan at Barnet, for whom he made his Football League debut on 21 January 2006 as an 88th-minute substitute in the League Two goalless draw against Wycombe Wanderers, but injured an ankle in a reserve game and made no further appearances. He was released at the end of the 2005–06 season, and spent the second half of the 2007–08 season with Gravesend & Northfleet in the Conference National.

References

External links

1984 births
Living people
Footballers from Farnborough, London
English footballers
Association football forwards
Charlton Athletic F.C. players
Barnet F.C. players
Ebbsfleet United F.C. players
Orpington F.C. players
English Football League players
National League (English football) players